Lamb's Creek Bridge, also known as Morgan County Bridge No. 146 and Burnett's Creek Bridge, is a historic Pratt through truss bridge located in Jefferson Township, Morgan County, Indiana. It was built in 1893 by the Wrought Iron Bridge Company. It is supported by cast-in-place concrete abutments.

The bridge was listed on the National Register of Historic Places in 2001.

See also
List of bridges documented by the Historic American Engineering Record in Indiana

References

External links

Historic American Engineering Record in Indiana
Road bridges on the National Register of Historic Places in Indiana
Bridges completed in 1893
Transportation buildings and structures in Morgan County, Indiana
National Register of Historic Places in Morgan County, Indiana
Wrought iron bridges in the United States